The Ukrainian Embassy in Zagreb is the diplomatic mission of Ukraine in Croatia. The embassy building is located at Voćarska cesta 52 in Zagreb . The Ukrainian ambassador to Croatia has been Vasyl Kyrylych since December 2019.

History 

Vasyl Kyrylych has been the ambassador since 2019.

After the collapse of the Soviet Union, Ukraine declared itself independent in August 1991. Croatia recognized it as an independent state on December 5, 1991. The establishment of diplomatic relations with Croatia was agreed in January 1994. The embassy in Zagreb was opened in 1995. Anatoly Shostak was accredited as the first ambassador .

In 2019, cooperation between the diplomatic universities of both countries was agreed upon.

Consular offices of Ukraine in Croatia 
The consular section of the Embassy of Ukraine in Zagreb

Embassy in Croatia 

The embassy is located at Voćarska cesta 52 in the northeast of the centre of the Croatian capital.

Ambassadors and envoys of Ukraine in Croatia 

Anatoly Shostak (1995-2001)
Andriy Olefirov (2001)
Viktor Kyryk (2001-2006)
Markian Lubkivskyi (2006-2009)
Borys Saychuk (2009-2010)
Anatoly Chernyshenko (2010)
Oleksandr Levchenko (2010-2017)
Yaroslav Simonov (2018)
Serhiy Horopacha (2019)
Vasyl Kyrylych (2019–)

See also
 Croatia-Ukraine relations
 List of diplomatic missions in Croatia
 Foreign relations of Croatia
 Foreign relations of Ukraine

References

Croatia–Ukraine relations
Zagreb
Ukraine